Roland Møller (born 28 May 1972) is a Danish actor. He won the Bodil Award for Best Actor in a Leading Role for Land of Mine (2015), and Best Actor in a Supporting Role for Nordvest (2013). He has appeared in high-profile films like A Hijacking, Darkland, Atomic Blonde, Papillon, and Skyscraper.

Early life
Møller grew up in a criminal environment in Odense, Denmark. He had 10 assault convictions and had served time for a total of four and a half years before he was released on parole under the condition he leave Odense in 2002. He subsequently attended Den Rytmiske Højskole, a music folk high school, and then moved to Copenhagen, where he began working with the rapper Jokeren as a songwriter.

Career
Møller made his acting debut in the 2010 prison drama film R. While Møller was originally involved as a consultant in the film set in Horsens State Prison, where he had served time, co-director Tobias Lindholm offered him an acting role in the film. Møller's performance in the film earned Supporting Actor nominations at the Bodil Awards and Danish Film Critics Association Awards. He then appeared in Lindholm's 2012 film A Hijacking and the 2013 film Northwest, directed by the other R co-director Michael Noer, for both of which he was nominated for the Bodil Award for Best Actor in a Supporting Role, the latter of which he also won.

In 2014, he appeared in A Second Chance. In 2015, he appeared in the war drama Land of Mine in his first leading role, for which he received the Bodil Award for Best Actor in a Leading Role.

In 2017, he appeared in the action thriller Darkland, the spy film Atomic Blonde, and the Papillon remake directed by Noer.

Filmography

References

External links
 

Living people
People from Odense
Danish male film actors
21st-century Danish male actors
Best Supporting Actor Bodil Award winners
Danish songwriters
Danish male criminals
People convicted of assault
1972 births
Best Actor Bodil Award winners